Pumpido is a surname. Notable people with the surname include:

 Cándido Conde-Pumpido (born 1949), Spanish judge
 Facundo Pumpido (born 1988), Argentinian footballer, nephew of Nery
 Nery Pumpido (born 1957), Argentinian footballer and coach

See also
 Pompidou (disambiguation)